Don't. Get. Out! is a 2018 German thriller film written, co-produced and directed by Christian Alvart. The film stars Wotan Wilke Möhring as a man who is contacted by a mysterious man demanding him to get an amount of money or he'll explode his car with him and his children inside. The movie is a remake of the Spanish thriller Retribution (2015).

Plot
Karl Brendt, a middle-aged man, is taking his children to the school when he gets an anonymous call from someone claiming that there's a bomb under his car's seats. The caller threats to blow the bomb, killing him and his children, if Brendt does not get him a large sum of money.

Cast

Production
Don't. Get. Out! is a remake of the Spanish thriller Retribution. The film was shot for about 7 weeks between March 22 and May 6, 2017, in Berlin.

Release

Reception
Sascha Westphal from the film magazine "epd Film" gave Don't. Get. Out! four out of five stars and wrote praising its cinematography and pace. Jaschar Marktanner writing for the website "film-rezensionen.de" praised Emily Kusche  performance, but criticized the film's lack of consistency and originality. Bianka Piringer from the web portal "Kino-Zeit" also criticized the film for its inconsistencies and stated that despite its promising beginning the movie sinks in the mediocrity at the end.

References

External links
 

2018 films
2018 thriller films
German thriller films
Remakes of Spanish films
Films directed by Christian Alvart
Films set in Berlin
Films shot in Berlin
2010s German films
2010s German-language films